Alba is a 2016 Ecuadorian drama film directed by Ana Cristina Barragán and starring Macarena Arias. It was selected as the Ecuadorian entry for the Best Foreign Language Film at the 90th Academy Awards, but it was not nominated.

Plot
Alba, a painfully shy 11-year-old girl, struggles to fit in while living with her infirm mother and loner father.

Cast
 Macarena Arias as Alba
 Pablo Aguirre Andrade as Igor
 Amaia Merino as Mamá

See also
 List of submissions to the 90th Academy Awards for Best Foreign Language Film
 List of Ecuadorian submissions for the Academy Award for Best Foreign Language Film

References

External links
 

2016 films
2016 drama films
2010s Spanish-language films
Ecuadorian drama films